The first name Konstantin is a derivation from the Latin name Constantinus (Constantine) in some European languages, such as Russian, Estonian and German. As a Christian given name, it refers to the memory of the Roman emperor Constantine the Great. A number of notable persons in the Byzantine Empire, and (via mediation by the Christian Eastern Orthodox Church) in Russian history and earlier East Slavic history are often referred to by this name. 

"Konstantin" means "firm, constant".

There is a number of variations of the name throughout European cultures:

 Константин (Konstantin) in Russian (diminutive Костя/Kostya), Bulgarian (diminutives Косьо/Kosyo, Коце/Kotse) and Serbian
 Костянтин (Kostiantyn) in Ukrainian (diminutive Костя/Kostya)
 Канстанцін (Kanstantsin) in Belarusian 
 Konstantinas in Lithuanian
 Konstantīns in Latvian
 Konstanty in Polish (diminutive Kostek)
 Constantin in Romanian (diminutive Costel), French
 Konstandin/Konstantin in Albania (usually among Orthodox people)
 Κωνσταντῖνος (Kōnstantînos) in Greek (diminutives include Kostas, Kostakis, Kostîs, Ntînos, Dînos) 
 Considine in Irish 
 Còiseam in Scottish Gaelic.

People bearing the name Konstantin include:

Given name 
Konstantin of Rostov (1186–1218), Grand Prince of Vladimir
Konstantin Chernenko (1911–1985), Soviet politician, General Secretary of the Communist Party
Konstantin Dobrev (born 1974), Bulgarian badminton player
Konstantin Feoktistov (1926–2009), Soviet cosmonaut
Konstantin Grigorishin (born 1965), Ukrainian billionaire businessman
Konstanty Kalinowski (1838–1864), 19th-century revolutionary who was one of the leaders of the January Uprising in Congress Poland
Konstantin Khanin, Russian mathematician
Konstantin Konik (1873–1936), Estonian politician and surgeon
Konstantin Korovin (1861–1939), Russian painter
Konstantin Kravchuk (born 1985), Russian tennis player
Konstantin Krizhevsky (1926–2000), Russian footballer
Konstantin Leontiev (1831–1891), Russian philosopher
Konstantin Märska (1896–1951), Estonian cinematographer
Konstantin Nahk (born 1975), Estonian football player
Konstantin von Neurath (1873–1956), German diplomat
Konstantin Päts (1874–1956), Estonian politician, first President of Estonia
Konstantin Petrzhak (1907-1998), Soviet physicist
 Konstantin Pysin (1910–1984), Soviet politician 
Konstantin Ramul (1879–1975), Estonian psychologist
Konstantin Rodzaevsky (1907-1946), The leader of the Russian Fascist Party
Konstantin Rokossovsky (1896-1968), Marshal of the Soviet Union
Konstantin Romanov (disambiguation)
Konstantin Romanov (ice hockey) (born 1985), Russian-Kazakh ice hockey player
Grand Duke Constantine Pavlovich of Russia (1779–1831), grand duke of Russia, son of Paul I
Grand Duke Konstantin Nikolayevich of Russia (1827–1892), grand duke of Russia, son of Nicholas I
Grand Duke Konstantin Konstantinovich of Russia (1858–1915), grand duke of Russia, grandson of Nicholas I, famous Russian poet
Prince Constantine Constantinovich of Russia (1891–1918), prince of Russia
Konstantin Rudnev (1911–1980), Soviet politician
Konstantin Shvedchikov (1884–1952), Soviet official 
Konstantin Stanislavsky (1863–1938), Russian actor and theater director
Konstantin Tsiolkovsky (1857–1935), Russian and Soviet rocket scientist and pioneer of the astronautic theory
Konstantín Alexeyevich Vasilyev (1942–1976), Russian illustrator
Konstantin Vassiljev (born 1984), Estonian football player
Konstantin Wecker (born 1947), German singer-songwriter

Surname 
Knyaz Konstantin (disambiguation)
Leopoldine Konstantin (1886–1965), Austrian actress
Stefan Konstantin (1282–1322), King of the Serbian Kingdom

Fictional characters 
Konstantin Levin, fictional character in Leo Tolstoy's Anna Karenina
Konstantin Gavrilovich Treplev, fictional character in Anton Chekhov's play The Seagull
Konstantin, fictional character in Codename Villanelle (2018 novel) and Killing Eve (2018—2022 television show)

See also
Konstantine
Constantin
Konstantinov
Konstantinovsk
Konstantinovsky (disambiguation)
Konstantinovka (disambiguation)

References

Bulgarian masculine given names
Russian masculine given names

es:Constantino
gl:Constantino
it:Constantine
sr:Константин (вишезначна одредница)
fi:Konstantinus
vo:Constantine